Bone-A-Fide is an album released by Christian rapper T-Bone. It was released in 2005. The album charted at #25 on the Billboard Christian albums chart and #44 on the Billboard Heatseakers chart.

Track listing 
The Rally
12 Years Ago
Hard Streets
Let That Thang Go
Can I Live
I Been Looking Around
Follow T
Hasta La Victoria Siempre!
A Few Good Men (ft. Mack 10)
Shake Ya Body
The Sanction
Y'all Can't Win (ft. Chino XL)
It's OK
Bounce
Victory! Victory! Victory!

References

2005 albums
T-Bone (rapper) albums